Hamitköy is an affluent northern suburb of North Nicosia in Cyprus. Hamitköy is under the de facto control of Northern Cyprus, and, since 2008, it has been under the jurisdiction of the Nicosia Turkish Municipality. As of 2011, Hamitköy had a population of 5,338. Prior to its urbanisation, it was better known as Mandres or Hamit Mandres.

References

Communities in Nicosia District
Populated places in Lefkoşa District
Suburbs of Nicosia